Our World is the third studio album from dancehall/reggae fusion group T.O.K., released in 2009.

Track listing 

All tracks include production by group members Alistaire McCalla, Roshaun Clarke, Craig Thompson, and Xavier Davidson.  Only additional production/songwriting credits are listed.

 Intro: Our World (M. Lawrence) — 2:06
 World Is Mine (R. Bailey, R. Fuller, A. Marshall) — 3:56
 Guardian Angel (A. Cooper, C. Morrison) — 3:16
 Couple Up (Cooper, Morrison) — 1:30
 Gangsters Never Die (D. Fearon, Cindy Walker) — 2:45
 I Wanna Love You (Lawrence) — 3:54
 Gimme Little [If You Want Me] (K. Thompson) — 3:53
 Me And My Dawgs (A. Kelly, L. Romans) — 3:42
 Die For You (C. Parkes) — 3:50
 Afternoon Porn Star (Kelly) — 4:10
 It's Over (Kelly) — 4:25
 Miss World (feat. Beenie Man)(M. Davis) — 3:15
 Whining  (Vanguards Remix)(C. Bahamonde, D. Ornellana, U. Vargas - the original track is on Flexx From T.O.K. presents: D'Link) — 2:41
 Gyrate (S. Brown, D. Medder) — 2:54
 Get Out [Don't Come Back] (Brown) — 3:22
 Live It Up (Acoustic Version) (Kelly, L. De La O) — 3:47

References

External links
 http://www.vprecords.com
 https://web.archive.org/web/20110707113749/http://www.allreggaelyrics.com/IndexSongList.php?id=T.O.K.

2009 albums
T.O.K. albums
VP Records albums